The Isorno is an Italian and Swiss river, a tributary of the Melezzo Orientale.

Its source is in Italy near Pioda di Crana. It passes through Bagni, a frazione of Craveggia, then entering Switzerland it flows through Onsernone, Mosogno, Isorno and Intragna, where it joins the Melezzo Orientale.

Its valley, although easily reached from  Lugano, Bellinzona, Domodossola and Locarno, is one of the wildest in Switzerland, and there is a proposal to institute a national park like that of Engadin.

Sources
This original version of this article included text translated from its counterpart in the Italian Wikipedia.

Rivers of Switzerland
Rivers of Ticino
Rivers of the Province of Verbano-Cusio-Ossola
Rivers of the Alps
Rivers of Italy